The stoppie is a motorcycle and bicycle trick in which the back wheel is lifted by abruptly applying the front brake, then, by carefully reducing the brake pressure, the bike is ridden for a short distance on the front wheel. It is also called an endo, or less commonly, a front wheelie.

See also
 Bicycle and motorcycle dynamics
 Motorcycle stunt riding
 Weight transfer

References

Cycling
Motorcycle stunts